Kvarnsjön ("mill lake") can refer to the following lakes in Sweden:

 Kvarnsjön, Gladö in Huddinge Municipality and Botkyrka Municipality
 Kvarnsjön, Lissma in Huddinge Municipality